Orsay (Scottish Gaelic: Orasaigh) is a small island in the Inner Hebrides of Scotland.  It lies a short distance off the west coast of the island of Islay and shelters the harbour of the village of Portnahaven.

The Rinns of Islay lighthouse was built on Orsay in 1825 by Robert Stevenson.

Footnotes

External links

Uninhabited islands of Argyll and Bute